Evan Jonigkeit (born February 18, 1983) is an American actor known for his roles in X-Men: Days of Future Past, Bone Tomahawk, and Easy. He recently played Dr. Raphael Clearwater in William Atticus Parker's 2023 film Atrabilious.

Early life 
Jonigkeit was raised in Bucks County, Pennsylvania and graduated from Neshaminy High School in 2001. He got accepted into Temple University with a baseball scholarship but after being sidelined with tendonitis, he started pursuing theater. As a young adult, Jonigkeit was employed doing lawn work.

Career 
After working in the theater community in Philadelphia, Jonigkeit was picked up by agency in New York. He got his break by starring in the 2011 Broadway play High which eventually led him to star in the Broadway play The Snow Geese alongside Mary-Louise Parker in 2013.

In 2014, Jonigkeit made his big-screen debut in X-Men: Days of Future Past playing comic book villain Toad.

In 2015, he starred alongside Kurt Russell in western Bone Tomahawk as Deputy Nick. In the same year he was cast to play Captain Chesterfield in Discovery Canada's series Frontier.

Jonigkeit and his production company, Rooster Films, produced their first short, Mildred & The Dying Parlor that starred Steve Buscemi and Jane Krakowski. In 2017, he produced a live event on Facebook called: Stand For Rights: A Benefit for the ACLU with Tom Hanks, for which he earned a Primetime Emmy nomination, and co-produced the ESPYs.

In 2017, Jonigkeit and Girls actress Zosia Mamet partnered with Refinery29 to produce an anthology series titled Fabled.

Jonigkeit starred on the Starz drama Sweetbitter, based on the novel of the same name. He played Will the backwaiter assigned to train Tess, who then becomes her first friend; the series premiered on May 6, 2018, and aired until 2019. In 2020, he had key roles in the horror films The Night House and The Empty Man.

Jonigkeit starred in season 1 of the Netflix series Archive 81 as Samuel Davenport, a major character and one of the main antagonists. Netflix released all eight episodes of season 1 of Archive 81 on Jan. 14, 2022.

Personal life 
In 2013, Jonigkeit started dating actress Zosia Mamet. They married on October 2, 2016.

Filmography

Film

Television

Producer

Theatre

References

External links

Living people
American male television actors
1983 births
Place of birth missing (living people)
21st-century American male actors